Janaka Bandara may refer to:

Janaka Bandara Tennakoon (born 1953), Sri Lankan politician and minister
Janaka Priyantha Bandara (born 1968), Sri Lankan governor and diplomat